Kai Manne Börje Siegbahn (20 April 1918 – 20 July 2007) was a Swedish physicist who was awarded the 1981 Nobel Prize in Physics.

Biography
Siegbahn was born in Lund, Sweden, son of Manne Siegbahn the 1924 physics Nobel Prize winner. Siegbahn earned his doctorate at the University of Stockholm in 1944. He was professor at the Royal Institute of Technology 1951–1954, and then professor of experimental physics at Uppsala University 1954–1984, which was the same chair his father had held. He shared the 1981 Nobel Prize in Physics with Nicolaas Bloembergen and Arthur Schawlow for their work in laser spectroscopy.

Siegbahn obtained the Nobel Prize for developing the method of Electron Spectroscopy for Chemical Analysis (ESCA), now usually described as X-ray photoelectron spectroscopy (XPS). At the time of his death he was still active as a scientist at the Ångström Laboratory at Uppsala University.

He was a member of the Norwegian Academy of Science and Letters from 1975.

Siegbahn died on 20 July 2007 at the age of 89.

Publications
Kai Siegbahn was one of the original editors of the Encyclopedia of Analytical Chemistry

References

External links

  including the Nobel Lecture, 8 December 1981 Electron Spectroscopy for Atoms, Molecules and Condensed Matter

1918 births
2007 deaths
Experimental physicists
Nobel laureates in Physics
Swedish physicists
Stockholm University alumni
Academic staff of the KTH Royal Institute of Technology
People from Lund
Members of the Pontifical Academy of Sciences
Foreign associates of the National Academy of Sciences
Foreign Members of the Russian Academy of Sciences
Members of the Norwegian Academy of Science and Letters
Swedish Nobel laureates
Academic staff of Uppsala University
Spectroscopists
Burials at Uppsala old cemetery
Presidents of the International Union of Pure and Applied Physics
Members of the Royal Swedish Academy of Sciences